Sulęcin may refer to the following places in Poland:
Sulęcin, a town in Lubusz Voivodeship (W Poland)
Sulęcin, Lower Silesian Voivodeship (south-west Poland)
Sulęcin, Greater Poland Voivodeship (west-central Poland)